La Cañada is a town located in the city of Alaquines, San Luis Potosi, Mexico.

Populated places in San Luis Potosí